Lynn Rogers Coleman (August 17, 1939 – November 13, 2020) was an American attorney who served as the third United States deputy secretary of energy from 1980 to 1981.

Early life and education 
Coleman was born in Vernon, Texas. He earned a Bachelor of Arts degree from Abilene Christian College in 1961 and a Juris Doctor from the University of Texas School of Law in 1964.

Career 
Coleman began his career as a lawyer for Vinson & Elkins in Houston. In 1973, he established the firm's Washington, D.C. office. During the 1972 United States Senate election in Texas, he was the campaign manager for Barefoot Sanders. A specialist in energy law, Coleman practiced before the Federal Power Commission and Federal Energy Administration. In 1978, President Jimmy Carter nominated Coleman to serve as general counsel of the newly-created United States Department of Energy. He served as United States deputy secretary of energy in 1980 and 1981. Coleman spent the rest of his career as a partner at Skadden, Arps, Slate, Meagher & Flom.

References 

1939 births
2020 deaths
People from Vernon, Texas
People from Fauquier County, Virginia
Texas lawyers
Lawyers from Washington, D.C.
Skadden, Arps, Slate, Meagher & Flom people

Carter administration personnel
United States Department of Energy officials
United States Deputy Secretaries of Energy
Abilene Christian University alumni
University of Texas School of Law alumni
Texas Democrats